Mart Kangur (also Vladimir Kangur; born 7 February 1903 Kohila Parish, Harrien County – 14 July 1998, Tallinn) was an Estonian politician, a member of the Communist Party of Estonia. He was a member of II Riigikogu, representing the Workers' United Front. On 29 February, he resigned his position and he was replaced by Aleksander Erdman.

References

1903 births
1998 deaths
People from Kohila Parish
People from Kreis Harrien
Workers' United Front politicians
Communist Party of Estonia politicians
Members of the Riigikogu, 1923–1926
Prisoners and detainees of Estonia
Soviet military personnel of World War II
Burials at Pärnamäe Cemetery